Carbolic may refer to:

 Phenol, also known as carbolic acid
 Carbolic soap, a type of soap containing carbolic acid

See also 

 Carlill v Carbolic Smoke Ball Company